Evert Breman (28 April 1859, Zwolle - 24 October 1926, Amsterdam) was a Dutch architect in the Renaissance Revival style.

Biography
He was one of six children born to Willem Fredrik Breman (1829-1875), owner of a carpentry and blacksmithing shop, and his wife, Everarda Elsebé née Meuleman. In 1881, he and his younger brother, Jacobus (known as "Co"), left Zwolle. Co would pursue his artistic career in Brussels, while Evert went to Amsterdam. There, he apparently worked as a butcher, while studying architecture in the evenings. His experience in his father's shop had already given him some basic knowledge of construction.

In 1887, he married Martha Maria Neumeijer (1857-1938), the daughter of Leendert Johannes Neumeijer Sr. (d.1906), a real estate agent and amateur architect. One of his grandchildren would describe him as a "tyrannical father".

Most of the site was devoted to the miniature village of "Old Holland", with 16th and 17th-century façades. For his work on the exhibition, he was named a Knight in the Order of Orange-Nassau.

These included their corporate headquarters, and the Lloyd Hotel. After 1923, he was employed in the real estate industry, as a supervisory Director for the North Holland Mortgage Bank. Although not an innovator, his buildings are highly regarded.

References

External links

 Brief biography and works @ Amsterdam op de Kaart

1859 births
1926 deaths
Dutch architects
Recipients of the Order of Orange-Nassau
People from Zwolle